Sant'Alberto Magno is a church in Rome, in Via delle Vigne Nuove in Rome Municipio III, dedicated to Saint Albertus Magnus (c. 1200–1280). The church is the seat of the title of "Sant'Alberto Magno", established 19 November 2016 by Pope Francis.

Cardinal Priest
Pope Francis established it as titular church on 19 November 2016.

Anthony Soter Fernandez (19 November 2016 – 28 October 2020)
Virgílio do Carmo da Silva (27 August 2022 – present)

References

External links

Titular churches
Rome Q. III Pinciano